Hawley Waterman (April 20, 1930 – February 20, 2015) was an American sports coach and athletics administrator.  He was the first head football coach at Newark State College—now known as Kean University—in Union, New Jersey, serving from 1970 to 1971 and compiling a record of 6–7.

Head coaching record

College football

References

External links
 Kean University Hall of Fame entry

1930 births
2015 deaths
Kean Cougars athletic directors
Kean Cougars football coaches
College men's lacrosse coaches in the United States
High school football coaches in New Jersey
High school lacrosse coaches in the United States
High school wrestling coaches in the United States
People from New Jersey